Zindagi is a book from British India, written by Chaudhry Afzal Haq, that shares moral and ethical lessons in life and the punishments and rewards in ones afterlife using humor. Zindagi was written in 1930s British India and by a leader and thinker of the Free India movement in The Punjab, while in jail for non-violently protesting British Colonial rule of India.

References

Urdu-language books
Urdu-language novels
1930s books
20th-century Indian books
Indian humour
Indian non-fiction books